Honey Butter Chips (허니버터칩) (also known as 허니버터칩 in Korea, ポテトチップスしあわせバター, Happiness Butter Potato Chips in Japan) is a brand of fried potato chips manufactured by Haitai Calbee and sold in South Korea.  The snack were first available in August 2014, and they are renowned for their rise to popularity through SNS (Social Network Services) viral marketing from late 2014 to early 2015. The company behind this creation was Korean Haitai in a joint effort with Japanese snack manufacturer Calbee. This snack was so popular that it created a trend called the Honey-Butter Craze among South Koreans.

Haitai-Calbee Joint Ventures 
Calbee previously produced a Honey Butter Chip in 2012 for the Japanese market. Calbee set up a joint venture with Haitai and expanded its snack market to Korea in order to increase profits in the Japanese snack market.

Honey Butter Craze 

The Honey-Butter Craze, or Honey Butter Yeolpung (Korean: 열풍, Chinese: 熱風), is a craze for the Honey Butter Chip product which first came out  in Korea in August 2014. The formal version of Honey Butter Chip named ‘Happiness Butter Potato Chips’ was produced by Calbee in Japan, 2012. This honey-flavored buttery potato chip did not gain popularity in Japan and was sold for a limited period of time. However, when Honey Butter Chip was introduced in Korea by Haitai-Calbee in August 2014, its popularity exploded among young consumers and quickly spread via social networks during the last quarter of 2014 and the first quarter of 2015. 
Haitai-Calbee enjoyed such tremendous popularity with Honey Butter Chip that the product was unavailable in stores and was being resold online for three times its original price.

Although limited in production and supply, the product has taken over the Korean market. To meet demand, Haitai-Calbee plans to build a factory in South Korea. This new facility is set to begin operation in early 2016.

After ‘Honey Butter Chip’ was released in August, Haitai-Calbee officially announced that sales in January and February 2015 had reached 23 billion won (USD 20.3 million), and has forecast of sales of one hundred billion won (USD one hundred million) by year-end.

Celebrity Influence 
The Honey Butter Craze spread further when Korean celebrities started endorsing the product. K-pop stars such as Sooyoung of Girls' Generation, Siwon of Super Junior, and T-ara's Hyomin began posing in selfies with gilded Honey Butter bags propped beside their cheeks and posting the pictures online. On August 31, 2021 k-pop boy group MCND released their album “THE EARTH : SECRET MISSION Chapter.1” which features the song H.B.C, standing for Honey Butter Chip. Actress So Yoo-Jin posted a picture of a bag on her Instagram account. A popular news broadcaster for KBS even proclaimed that she was “laughing and crying over one bag of chips” and uploaded a picture of herself holding up the famously elusive golden yellow bag.
 On the May 23rd broadcast of MBC's My Little Television, rock singer Jung Joon Young reviewed and compared many types of honey-butter-flavored snacks in the Korean market.

Limited Supply 
The product has gone viral through social networks and achieved popularity in Korea. Haitai-Calbee had to temporarily suspend its order in November 2014 because of overwhelming demand.
"Honey Butter Chip may be one of the most difficult products to buy these days,” said a Korean convenience store owner. Many convenience stores put up paper signs with “Honey Butter Chip, sold out”. Some stores made ‘Honey Butter Chip waiting list’ for customers and limited the selling quantity as one bag for a person.
In January 2015, a so-called “Honey Butter Chip-Hunting” smartphone app was launched. The app tells the availability of the product at near convenience stores. More than 10,000 people had downloaded the app.
Due to the scarcity, in December 2014, Honey Butter Chips were traded back and forth on e-commerce websites at inflated prices, reaching nearly 50 times the original cost of a 60-gram bag.

To keep up with the huge demand for Honey Butter Chip, Haitai-Calbee has raised its production by a factor of three and put its production line in full operation for 24 hours. Although the product was in short supply, the company did not further increase production because the actual demand is not obvious and crazes can be short-lived.

Line Extensions 

 Jagabee Honey Mild
 Honey butter potato fries created by Haitai-Calbee
 Honey Tong Tong
 Ridged triangle potato chips created by Haitai (not joint with Calbee) after the viral popularity of Honey Butter Chips

Special Editions 

 Honey Butter Chip Special Edition - Canada Maple Syrup 
 Honey Butter Chip Special Edition - Cherry Blossom 
 Honey Butter Chip Winter Warmers - Almond Caramel 
 Honey Butter Chip Special Edition - Lavender & Blueberry 
 Honey Butter Chip Special Edition - Chou Cream & Maple Syrup
 Honey Butter Chip Special Edition - Fromage Blanc
 Honey Butter Chip Save the Date - Wedding Cake
 Honey Butter Chip Special Edition - Sentimental Season - Mocha
 Honey Butter Chip Especial Edicion - Dulce de Leche

Competitor Products 
After Honey Butter Chip became famous, many companies have produced similar products which plagiarize the name, design, and flavor of its original  to take advantage of the popularity of Honey Butter Chip. The word ‘Honey Butter’ are used by companies to promote their food products to the consumers as if it is a magic spell for high sales of product. A major Korean food maker, Nongshim has launched ‘Sumi Chip Honey Mustard’ in December, whose taste is similar to Honey Butter Chip. Unlike Honey Butter Chip, Sumi chip was easier to find in many stores. Therefore, consumers started to buy Sumi chip as a replacement. The Sumi Chip became more popular than its original, and sold four times more than the Honey Butter Chip with average of ten thousands pack per day. Nongshim has achieved the new record of having the greatest monthly sales in the Korean snack industry. Because of the supply shortage and many other copy products, Honey Butter Chip which once had the highest sales during the last quarter of 2014 fell to the third place in the snack sales of January and February, 2015.

NongShim "Sumi Potato Chips"
Due to the limited manufacturing of the original Honey Butter Chips, the product became increasingly difficult to find, prompting South Korean food manufacturer NongShim to release their own similar product in mass volumes. With the widespread availability of NongShim's chips, Sumi Potato Chips overtook Honey Butter Chips in sales.

Lotte "Honey Drunken Potato Chips" (꿀먹은 감자칩)

Other products are not only limited in the area of confectioneries and food products, but even in other goods such as cosmetic products made of Honey and Butter, and furniture designed in the shape of pack of Honey Butter Chip.

Recipes on YouTube
During the craze, homemade Honey Butter Chip recipes began to be posted on YouTube. Using ingredients that can be easily found, people can make their own potato chips with similar flavors to the original product.

References

External links
Haitai English Website
https://www.calbee.com/

Snack foods
South Korean cuisine
Korean snack food